{{DISPLAYTITLE:Zinc L-aspartate}}

Zinc -aspartate, often simply called zinc aspartate, is a chelated zinc supplement. Zinc aspartate is a salt of zinc with the amino acid aspartic acid.

Chemical properties 
Zinc aspartate is a white crystalline powder. It is soluble in dilute hydrochloric acid and insoluble in water.

Bioavailability 
There are no specific bioavailability studies that were made available on this dietary mineral. It is assumed that the reported solubility of zinc aspartate in diluted hydrochloric acid will allow its dissociation and absorption in the stomach. However, it was not clear if further absorption could take place in the intestine considering its reported insolubility in water.

Hazards 
Potential acute health effects may include skin and eye irritation. If inhaled, it can cause lung irritation.

See also 
Compounds of zinc

References 

Dietary supplements
Dietary minerals
L-aspartate